Lewistown is a city in Fulton County, Illinois, United States. It was named by its founder, Ossian M. Ross, after his oldest son, Lewis W. Ross. The population was 2,384 at the 2010 census, down from 2,522 at the 2000 census. It is the county seat of Fulton County. Located in central Illinois, it is southwest of Peoria. It is the source of Spoon River Anthology by Edgar Lee Masters, who lived there. Native American burial mounds are nearby at Dickson Mounds off Illinois Route 97.

History
The city was named for Lewis Ross, the son of a first settler. The Lewistown post office has been in operation since 1831. It contains a tempera on canvas mural titled Lewiston Milestones, painted by Ida Abelman in 1941, depicting the Lincoln–Douglas debates. Murals were produced from 1934 to 1943 in the United States through the Section of Painting and Sculpture, later called the Section of Fine Arts, of the U.S. Treasury Department.

Geography
Lewistown is located in central Fulton County at  (40.396254, -90.154609). U.S. Route 24 passes through the center of the city, leading northeast  to Peoria and southwest  to Quincy. Illinois Route 97 leads north from Lewistown  to Galesburg.

D==Tourist attractions==
Oak Hill Cemetery is located in Lewistown. This cemetery was made famous by Edgar Lee Masters in his Spoon River Anthology.

It is one of the largest floodplain restoration projects in the United States outside the Florida Everglades.

It is one of the major archaeological museums in the United States.

The Rasmussen Blacksmith Shop Museum is located on Main Street of Lewistown. It is one of the few blacksmith shops left in the United States. It has been run by the Rasmussen family since 1880.

The Spoon River Valley Scenic Drive is an event sponsored by the city of Lewistown in the fall of each year. It includes a plethora of shops and stands that sell a variety of products.

Lewistown Music in the Park is held every Thursday night 7-9pm for 10 weeks during the summer in Porter Park at the gazebo. Music in the Park features local talent, and admission is free.

Demographics

As of the census of 2000, there were 2,522 people, 1,092 households, and 661 families residing in the city. The racial makeup of the city was 98.93% White, 0.08% African American, 0.20% Native American, 0.04% Asian, 0.08% Pacific Islander, 0.20% from other races, and 0.48% from two or more races. Hispanic or Latino of any race were 1.07% of the population.

There were 1,092 households, out of which 25.8% had children under the age of 18 living with them, 48.4% were married couples living together, 9.7% had a female householder with no husband present, and 39.4% were non-families. 36.5% of all households were made up of individuals, and 21.1% had someone living alone who was 65 years of age or older. The average household size was 2.23 and the average family size was 2.89.

In the city, the population was spread out, with 21.6% under the age of 18, 7.3% from 18 to 24, 26.2% from 25 to 44, 20.9% from 45 to 64, and 24.1% who were 65 years of age or older. The median age was 41 years. For every 100 females, there were 88.5 males. For every 100 females age 18 and over, there were 83.9 males.

The median income for a household in the city was $30,943, and the median income for a family was $40,431. Males had a median income of $31,979 versus $19,569 for females. The per capita income for the city was $15,620. About 4.8% of families and 7.1% of the population were below the poverty line, including 5.9% of those under age 18 and 8.7% of those age 65 or over.

Notable people
Thomas A. Boyd, congressman from Illinois, 1877-1881
Tony Butkovich, All-American football fullback for Illinois & Purdue, 1944 first round NFL draft pick (#11) for the Cleveland Rams, killed in action at Okinawa, graduated from Lewistown High School (Illinois)
Reed F. Cutler, Illinois legislator and lawyer, practiced law in Lewistown
Jack Depler, professional football player and coach; born in Lewistown
William S. Jewell, Illinois legislator and lawyer
Lloyd Loar, Gibson sound engineer and master luthier in the early part of the 20th century; graduated from Lewistown High School in 1903
Edgar Lee Masters, poet, writer, lawyer
John Wesley Ross, Washington, D.C., attorney and politician; Illinois state representative; born in Lewistown
Leonard F. Ross, brigadier general in the American Civil War; born in Lewistown
Lewis W. Ross, Illinois attorney, merchant, and U.S. congressman from Illinois' 9th district, 1863-1869
Ossian M. Ross, major in the War of 1812; founder of Lewistown
Newton J. Walker, a pioneer farmer and merchant
Lila Acheson Wallace, co-founder of Reader's Digest; attended high school in Lewistown
Barbara Woodell, actress; born in Lewistown

References

External links

City of Lewistown official website
Rasmussen Blacksmith Shop Museum
Lewistown History

Cities in Illinois
Cities in Fulton County, Illinois
County seats in Illinois
1831 establishments in Illinois